Frank Biggins (24 June 1884 – 1962) was an English footballer who played as an outside right for South Kirkby, Barnsley and Castleford Town.

Early life
Biggins was born and raised in Brownhills, Staffordshire, the eldest of nine children born to John Biggins, a coal miner, and Elizabeth Biggins (née Wilton). By 1901, the teenaged Biggins was also working as a coal miner in Brownhills before moving to Yorkshire, where he boarded with Yorkshire footballer Harry Ness.

Playing career
Biggins began his football career with South Kirkby before being signed by Barnsley in May 1908. In August 1911, he left Oakwell for Castleford Town.

References

1884 births
1962 deaths
People from Brownhills
Date of death missing
English footballers
Association football forwards
South Kirkby Colliery F.C. players
Barnsley F.C. players